Thorpe Larches is a small hamlet in County Durham in North East England, situated between Sedgefield and Stockton-on-Tees. There are approximately 21 buildings, 19 of which are houses, and the other two a car garage and a packaging warehouse. The hamlet has around 60 residents.

The village is within catchment range of at least one primary school and one secondary school.

Nearby towns include:
 Stockton-on-Tees
 Billingham
 Middlesbrough
 Darlington
 Yarm
 Sedgefield

Hamlets in County Durham